The Roman Catholic Diocese of Buta is a diocese located in the city of Buta  in the Ecclesiastical province of Kisangani in the Democratic Republic of the Congo.

History
 1898: Established as Apostolic Prefecture of Uélé from the Apostolic Vicariate of Léopoldville
 December 18, 1911: Renamed as Apostolic Prefecture of Western Uélé
 April 15, 1924: Promoted as Apostolic Vicariate of Western Uélé
 March 10, 1926: Renamed as Apostolic Vicariate of Buta
 November 10, 1959: Promoted as Diocese of Buta

Bishops

Ordinaries, in reverse chronological order
 Bishops of Buta (Latin Rite), below
 Bishop Joseph Banga Bane (1996.09.27 – 2021.05.17)
 Bishop Jacques Mbali (1961.07.04 – 1996.09.27)
 Bishop Georges Désiré Raeymaeckers, O. Praem. (1959.11.10 – 1960.10.10); see below
 Vicars Apostolic of Buta (Latin Rite), below
 Bishop Georges Désiré Raeymaeckers, O. Praem. (1953.02.04 – 1959.11.10); see above
 Bishop Charles A. Vanuytven, O. Praem. (1924.05.06 – 1952)
 Prefect Apostolic of Western Uélé (Latin Rite), below
 Fr. Leone Dérikx, O. Praem. (1912 – 1924)

Coadjutor bishop
Joseph Banga Bane (1995-1996)

See also
Roman Catholicism in the Democratic Republic of the Congo

Sources
 GCatholic.org
 Catholic Hierarchy

Roman Catholic dioceses in the Democratic Republic of the Congo
Religious organizations established in 1898
Roman Catholic dioceses and prelatures established in the 19th century
1898 establishments in the Congo Free State
Roman Catholic Ecclesiastical Province of Kisangani